The Port Stephens Examiner is a weekly newspaper published in Raymond Terrace, New South Wales, Australia since 1893. The Port Stephens Examiner has also been published as the Gloucester Examiner and Lower Hunter Advertiser and the Raymond Terrace Examiner and Lower Hunter and Port Stephens Advertiser.

History
The Gloucester Examiner and Lower Hunter Advertiser was first published on 24 November 1893 by William Brown. Brown had earlier worked on the Gloucester Gazette and Lower Hunter and Williams River Advocate which had ceased publication earlier in 1893. Brown changed the name of the paper to Raymond Terrace Examiner and Lower Hunter and Port Stephens Advertiser in 1905. In 1981 the name was changed to the Port Stephens Examiner and it continues to be published under this name by Australian Community Media.

Digitisation
The paper has been digitised as part of the Australian Newspapers Digitisation Program project of the National Library of Australia.

See also
 List of newspapers in Australia
 List of newspapers in New South Wales

References

External links 
 
 

Mass media in the Hunter Region
Newspapers published in New South Wales
Port Stephens Council
Newspapers on Trove
Weekly newspapers published in Australia